Bannari Amman temple is one of the Amman temples in Tamil Nadu, India. It is located in Bannari on NH 209, near Sathyamangalam, Erode district. The main deity at the temple is goddess Mariamman (the goddess of rain), an avatar of goddess Parvathi. The goddess is considered powerful in the Tamil and Kannada folklore, and roughly every village in the Kongu region of Tamil Nadu has a Mariamman temple.

History
Legend has it that Bannari Mariamman was a historian. At that time, a husband and wife from the Vannar community took laundry for washing in the river, which was located under a large hill. The woman was then a full month pregnant. At that time, the woman was in labor. Then the husband tied the sari he had brought for washing and helped his wife to deliver the baby. Legend has it that two girls were born. Then he lifted one child and the other could not sleep. Then the trio left the baby in a nearby trough and went to the village counter. Then they went with them to where the baby was, and the child could not sleep. Then they tried to put the baby to sleep with iron tongs "There are small wounds on the mother's right chest" History says that the mother woke up in the form of a girl child when she saw the child inside the maid in the morning. The mother came in a dream and told her to have a festival. Then, on the day of the village festival, everyone took the green flour as per the Kongu custom and went towards the north. The structure of the goddess remains the same to this day. And one more history says the god was found by the people from the place called velliyam Palayam, one farmer watching his cow going away from his sight every day. One day he followed the cow, and he found the cow going near to the god and giving its own milk to the god every day. The god is known as Bannari Amman and even this history was drawn in Bannari Amman temple.

Getting There

By Road 
There are lot of buses from Sathyamangalam(15 km), Punjai Puliampatti, Bhavanisagar, Thalavadi and Chamarajanagar (60 km) to reach Bannari. The buses from Coimbatore, Tiruppur and Erode to Mysore, Chamarajanagar and Kollegal on NH 209 also passes through Bannari. One can also get the buses from Bhavanisagar and reach the temple via Kothamangalam, but this is a long route to reach Bannari.
And on every Sunday, Monday, Friday and new moon days there are special buses to the temple from Sathyamangalam, Punjai Puliampatti, Erode, Tiruppur, Gobichettipalayam and Coimbatore.

By Rail 
The nearest railway station is Mettupalayam, the other near railways stations are Coimbatore 70 km, Erode 60 km, Tiruppur 55 km and Chamarajanagar 60 km.

By Air 
The nearest airport is the one at Coimbatore for reaching Bannari.

Kundam Festival
Kundam Festival is celebrated in the Tamil Month of Panguni (March - April). This is the most famous annual festival, lakhs of devotees from different directions throng the temple in this month which is marked by festivity and gaiety. Erode district will get a local holiday during this famous Kundam festival.

Poojas

 Darshan (meaning open to the public) hours are from 5.30 a.m. to 9.00 p.m.

 Kalasanthi (5.30 A.M)
 Uchikalam (12.00 P.M)
 Sayaratchai (5.30 P.M)
 Arthasamam (8.30 P.M)

 Women devotees participate in Thiruvilakku pooja on last Friday of every Tamil month.

See also
 Mariamman
 Periya Mariyamman Temple

References

External links
 Dinamalar-Bannari Amman Temple

Mariamman temples
Hindu temples in Erode district